Yakedake may refer to:

Mount Yake, an active volcano in the Hida Mountains, Japan
11140 Yakedake, an asteroid named after the volcano